Lights is the debut studio album by English singer and songwriter Ellie Goulding, released on 26 February 2010 by Polydor Records. Goulding collaborated with several producers on the album, including Starsmith, Fraser T. Smith, Frankmusik, Richard "Biff" Stannard, Ash Howes, Liam Howe, Fred Falke and Mumford & Sons' Ben Lovett. The album received generally positive reviews from music critics. Commercially, it debuted atop the UK Albums Chart with first-week sales of 36,854 copies. In North America, Lights charted at number 21 in the United States and at number 66 in Canada. Four singles were released from the album: "Under the Sheets", "Starry Eyed", "Guns and Horses" and "The Writer".

The album was re-released as Bright Lights on 29 November 2010, including seven new tracks. It spawned two additional singles—a cover version of Elton John's "Your Song", which peaked at number two on the UK Singles Chart, and "Lights", which reached number two on the Billboard Hot 100 and became Goulding's most successful single in the US. On 8 March 2011, the album was released in the United States, with two songs removed and featuring three songs that were previously not available on the original version, but were included on the Bright Lights reissue.

On 26 February 2020, Goulding re-released the album once again for its tenth anniversary. Entitled Lights 10, the re-release includes the seven bonus tracks previously featured on Bright Lights along with the six remixes featured on the 2010 EP Run into the Light. For Record Store Day 2020, Goulding announced an LP release of this reissue; pressed as a double LP on recycled vinyl to reduce environmental impact.

Background
Goulding dropped out of a degree programme at the University of Kent after two years in order to pursue her musical career. She explained to BBC Wales, "I'd entered a university talent contest and was spotted by some people in the audience". She signed a record deal with Polydor Records in July 2009. However, Goulding opted to release lead single "Under the Sheets" on independent label Neon Gold Records so she would not feel under pressure.

Goulding explained that the album consists of "songs that all started on a guitar over a period of about two years. A number of the songs vent romantic victories and failures." She revealed that the first song she ever wrote, "Wish I Stayed", is featured on the album. She met chief producer Starsmith after moving to Bromley, London, from her home in Hereford. In an interview, she explained, "Meeting Starsmith was a godsend. We're like brother and sister. We fight a lot but you can't get anywhere without creative tension." Goulding worked with producers Starsmith, Frankmusik, Fraser T. Smith, Richard Stannard and Ash Howes. The majority of the album was recorded in Starsmith's bedroom in Bromley. She told the Daily Star, "Though I write on guitar, I hear the entire sound of songs in my head. And Fin [Starsmith] is someone who understands."

Promotion

Performances

Goulding played live at Coachella Valley Music and Arts Festival in April 2011. She made her American television debut on Jimmy Kimmel Live! on 7 April 2011, where she performed "Starry Eyed". On 29 April 2011, Goulding sang "about 14 songs" at the reception party of Prince William and Catherine Middleton's wedding at Buckingham Palace, including her rendition of "Your Song" for the couple's first dance. She performed both "Lights" and "Your Song" on Saturday Night Live on 7 May 2011 and on The Early Show on 30 July 2011. Goulding performed, for the second consecutive year, at Radio 1's Big Weekend on 14 May 2011. The singer headlined the 2011 Wakestock festival in Wales, performing on 8 July.

In August, she performed at V Festival for her second year in a row. On 6 August 2011, Goulding performed at Lollapalooza in Chicago. On 1 December 2011, the singer performed at the White House during the National Christmas Tree lighting ceremony, alongside the likes of Big Time Rush and will.i.am. Goulding performed at the annual Nobel Peace Prize Concert on 11 December 2011 in Oslo, Norway. Goulding was a musical guest on Late Show with David Letterman on 18 January 2012, performing "Lights". She also performed the track on The Ellen DeGeneres Show on 11 April 2012.

Tour
Goulding toured in support of Lights and supported Passion Pit in March 2010 and John Mayer during his UK tour in May and June 2010. During the summer she performed at a number of festivals. She performed at the Dot to Dot Festival in Bristol on 29 May and in Nottingham the following day. On 25 June, she performed a set at the Glastonbury Festival 2010 on the John Peel Stage. The singer performed at the iTunes Festival 2010 at the Roundhouse in London on 8 July; her set was released digitally as an EP on 15 July 2010, and was ultimately included as bonus content on the iTunes version of Bright Lights. Goulding made her T in the Park debut on 11 July. She played on the Nissan Juke Arena at the 2010 V Festival in late August. In September she was part of the line-up for Bestival 2010 on the Isle of Wight. In support of the album in Europe, Goulding performed on the first day of Pukkelpop in Belgium, at the Open'er Festival in Poland and at Benicàssim in Spain. In March and April 2011, Goulding embarked on a tour across North America to support the release of Lights in the United States.

Singles
"Under the Sheets" was released as the album's lead single on 9 November 2009, reaching number 53 on the UK Singles Chart. Follow-up single "Starry Eyed", released on 22 February 2010, peaked at number four. "Guns and Horses" was released on 17 May 2010 as the third single from the album, and charted at number 26 in the UK. The album's fourth single, "The Writer", was released on 8 August 2010, reaching number 19 on the UK Singles Chart.

Goulding's cover of Elton John's 1970 song "Your Song" was released on 12 November 2010 as the lead single from the Bright Lights re-release. It became Goulding's second highest-peaking single to date on the UK chart, reaching number two. The song was featured in the 2010 John Lewis Christmas advert in the United Kingdom.

The album's title track, which was originally available only as a bonus track on iTunes, was released as the second single from Brights Lights on 13 March 2011, peaking at number 49 in the UK. "Lights" was released in the United States and Canada on 23 May 2011, reaching number two on the Billboard Hot 100 and number seven on the Canadian Hot 100. By June 2013, the song had sold four million copies in the US.

Critical reception

Lights received generally positive reviews from music critics. At Metacritic, which assigns a normalised rating out of 100 to reviews from mainstream publications, the album received an average score of 65, based on 19 reviews. Neil McCormick of The Daily Telegraph praised Starsmith's "lush electro-dance production", stating it "evokes a gushing, breathless rush of heady emotion that might have benefited from at least a dash of restraint and intimacy." Camilla Pia of The Fly magazine wrote, "Packed full of sparkling pop with a folky heart and an electronic edge, the debut is ridiculously infectious". Caryn Ganz of Spin called the album "[s]hiny, wholesome dance-pop" and wrote that Goulding "glides through blippy anthems [...], pumping disco [...], and delicate grooves [...] with a pixie-ish voice that's one notch sweeter than Metric's Emily Haines." AllMusic's Matthew Chisling opined that the album "lacks the dramatic crash and bang of Florence + the Machine's Lungs, but is certainly a more restrained, compelling listen than the debut records by Pixie Lott and Little Boots", adding that "Goulding is able to take the best parts of all of her contemporaries' styles and create pleasantly surprising records."

Stephen Troussé of Pitchfork wrote, "Outside of its immediate context, Lights is a sometimes great, always promising debut. It's an album about leaving home, and it works best when the contrast between the folk singer and the pop production chimes with the tensions between the pull of home and the allure of the city." Jody Rosen of Rolling Stone commented that the album "places [Goulding's] vocals and minor-key melodies against producer Starsmith's club-ready mix of synths and brisk, busy electro rhythms. The results are moody [...], pretty [...] and uniformly catchy." In a mixed review, Claire Allfree of Metro viewed the album as "undeniably pretty aerated synthpop", but felt that "Goulding's girly, heartfelt voice is oddly depthless, while the electronic vapour and four-to-the-floor house beats swoop in a wash of perfectly calibrated bland sound." Mark Beaumont of NME expressed that "there's nothing here groundbreaking enough to justify the critical frothing. It's largely straight-ahead folk-pop dappled with a mild ground-frost of sequenced beats, Auto-Tune, and synth sizzles." David Renshaw of Drowned in Sound stated that "Lights sounds like a naïve folk album given a blog house remix" and concluded, "Devoid of a true soul or sense of honesty Lights can be a pretty hollow listen." The Guardians Alexis Petridis was unimpressed, dismissing the album as "general acoustic singer-songwriter material".

Commercial performance
Lights debuted at number one on the UK Albums Chart, selling 36,854 copies in its first week. The following week, the album dropped to number 16 with 19,398 copies sold—the third biggest fall from number one ever in the UK, after Christina Aguilera's Bionic (2010), which fell to number 29, and George Harrison's All Things Must Pass (1971), which fell to number 18 (although the latter had already spent eight weeks at the summit and was partially affected by a postal strike). Following the release of Bright Lights in late November 2010, the album re-entered the top 100 at number 24, selling 23,629 copies. It was the 24th best-selling album of 2010 in the UK, having sold nearly 300,000 copies by late November 2010. In early January 2011, the album returned to the top 10, where it continued for six weeks. Following Goulding's performance at the reception party of Prince William and Catherine Middleton's wedding on 29 April 2011, the album returned once again to the top 10 on 8 May after an absence of 13 weeks, jumping from number 23 to number 10 on sales of 11,981 units. Lights was certified double platinum by the British Phonographic Industry (BPI) on 22 July 2013. By April 2020, the album had sold over 840,000 copies in the UK.

Lights debuted on the Irish Albums Chart at number 12 on 4 March 2010. Following the Bright Lights reissue, the album entered the Irish top 10 for the first time, attaining a new peak position of number six on 24 February 2011. Elsewhere, the album reached number eight on the European Top 100 Albums chart, number 28 in New Zealand, number 35 in Norway, number 42 in Germany, number 54 in Belgium and number 90 in Switzerland.

On the issue dated 26 March 2011, Lights debuted at number 129 on the Billboard 200 and at number one on the Heatseekers Albums chart in the United States, selling 4,000 copies in its first week. Following a string of US performances, including Saturday Night Live, the album re-entered the Billboard 200 at number 82 on 21 May 2011, climbing to number 76 the following week. On 21 July 2012, the album rose from number 116 to its peak position of number 21 with sales of 23,000 copies—an increase of 444% from the previous week. As of June 2012, the album had sold 300,000 units in the US. Lights debuted at number 76 on the Canadian Albums Chart on 12 May 2011, peaking at number 66 the following week. The album had sold 1.6 million copies worldwide as of October 2012.

Track listing

Lights 10

Notes
  signifies an original producer
  signifies a remixer

Personnel

Lights
Credits adapted from the liner notes of Lights.

Musicians
 Ellie Goulding – vocals ; acoustic guitar ; piano 
 Starsmith – keyboards, drum programming ; bass ; saxophone 
 Seye Adelekan – backing vocals, acoustic guitar ; electric guitar 
 Charlie Morton – backing vocals, additional acoustic guitar 
 Joe Clegg – drums 
 Stevie Blacke – live strings 
 Frankmusik – keyboards, backing vocals, programming 
 Fraser T. Smith – keyboards 

Technical
 Starsmith – production 
 Mark "Spike" Stent – mixing 
 Julian Kindred – drum engineering 
 Matt Hill – drum engineering 
 Frankmusik – production, recording 
 Fraser T. Smith – production 
 Beatriz Artola – engineering 
 Naweed – mastering

Artwork
 Alan Clarke – photography
 Traffic – design

Bright Lights
Credits adapted from the liner notes of Bright Lights.

Musicians
 Ellie Goulding – vocals ; guitar ; acoustic guitar ; mandolin 
 Steve Malcolmson – programming 
 Richard "Biff" Stannard – bass, keyboards 
 Ash Howes – drums, keyboards 
 Starsmith – programming, acoustic guitar, bass, electric guitar, backing vocals 
 Joe Clegg – drums 
 Liam Howe – programming, all other instruments 
 Crispin Hunt – guitar, keyboards 
 Fred Falke – keyboards, drum programming ; bass ; guitar 
 Ruth de Turberville – cello, backing vocals 
 Ben Lovett – piano, backing vocals, kick drum 
 Matt Wiggins – timpani 

Technical
 Richard "Biff" Stannard – production, mixing 
 Ash Howes – production, mixing 
 Starsmith – production 
 Jeremy Wheatley – mixing 
 Richard Edgeler – mixing assistance 
 Julian Kindred – engineering 
 Liam Howe – production, mixing, engineering 
 Fred Falke – production 
 Rob Blake – original production 
 Crispin Hunt – original production 
 Ben Lovett – production 
 Matt Lawrence – engineering, mixing 
 Naweed – mastering

Artwork
 Scott Trindle – photography
 Traffic – design

Charts

Weekly charts

Year-end charts

Decade-end charts

Certifications

Release history

References

2010 debut albums
Albums produced by Fraser T. Smith
Albums produced by Fred Falke
Cherrytree Records albums
Ellie Goulding albums
Interscope Geffen A&M Records albums
Interscope Records albums
Polydor Records albums
Albums produced by Ash Howes
Albums produced by Richard Stannard (songwriter)